The Ekati Diamond Mine ("Ekati") is Canada's first surface and underground diamond mine. Until 2014 Ekati was a joint venture between Dominion Diamond Mines (80%), and the two geologists who discovered kimberlite pipes north of Lac de Gras, Chuck Fipke and Stewart Blusson each holding a 10% stake in the mine, until Fipke sold his share to Dominion.

History
The first volcanic pipe found in the Lac de Gras region was the Point Lake kimberlite, discovered by Chuck Fipke and Stewart Blusson who had been prospecting in the region for almost ten years, having found kimberlite indicator minerals as early as 1985. The Point Lake kimberlite was determined to be uneconomic, but its discovery precipitated one of largest staking rushes in mining history, covering most of the area between Yellowknife and the Arctic coast. There are 156 known kimberlite pipes within the Ekati block of claims, including the Point Lake pipe. Ekati officially began operations on October 14, 1998, and was operated by BHP.

The next kimberlites to be developed at Ekati will be mined using open pit methods and are named Jay and Sable, discovered in 1993 and 1995, respectively. Underground mining of the Misery kimberlite will commence in 2020, after open pit operations have been completed. Ekati Diamond mine, which is currently operated by Dominion Diamond is scheduled to remain operational until 2033.

On November 13, 2012, CBC News reported that the Harry Winston Diamond Corporation, 40% owners of Diavik Diamond Mine, would buy Ekati for US$500 million.

Geology
Diamonds at the Ekati site are found in 45- to 62-million-year-old kimberlite pipes (Creaser et al., 2004) of the Lac de Gras kimberlite field, most of which lie underneath shallow lakes. The mining needs the construction of frozen dam cores with heat pipes that inhibits water transfer to the open pit during mining activities.

Mining and marketing
Between 1998 and 2009, the mine has produced 40 million carats of diamonds out of six open pits. As the high grade ore close to surface was depleted, development was completed to access the ore utilizing underground methods. Currently, there is one underground operation (Misery Underground) with open-cut mining occurring in Sable Pit. The mine's current annual production is estimated to be approximately 7.5 million carats of diamonds.

Ekati supplies rough diamonds to the global market through its sorting and selling operations in Canada, Belgium, and India.

Transportation
Mine workers fly-in fly-out through Ekati Airport.

Gallery

See also
Hugo Dummett of BHP, credited as co-discoverer of Ekati
Volcanism of Canada
Volcanism of Northern Canada
Ekati Airport

Footnotes

References
 Creaser, R.A. et al., 2004. "Macrocrystal phlogopite Rb-Sr dates for the Ekati property kimberlites, Slave Province, Canada: evidence for multiple intrusive episodes in the Paleocene and Eocene", 8th International Kimberlite Conference Selected Papers, vol. 1, pp. 399–414.
 Abraham, Carolyn, October 11, 2006. "X marks the spotlight for elusive benefactor", Globe & Mail.
 Stuart Blusson from the GSC to Ekati
 ]

Further reading
Kevin Krajick, Barren Lands: An Epic Search for Diamonds in the North American Arctic. 2001, Freeman/Henry Holt, . Review at Smithsonian Magazine
 Chapter 17. Diamond Exploration – Ekati and Diavik Mines, Canada by Charles J. Moon (Google Books preview )in Charles J. Moon, M. K. G. Whateley, Anthony M. Evans, Introduction to Mineral Exploration, 2nd Edition. 2006,Wiley-Blackwell. .
Figures and captions from Chapter 17 are available at publisher's site

External links 
Official website by the current operators, Dominion Diamond Mines. Includes a photo of the largest diamond yet found, a 186 ct. water-white gem found in 2016.
Ekati Diamond Mine photos at Google Images
Ekati Diamond Mine profile at BHP Billiton Watch
 CanadaMark+

1998 establishments in the Northwest Territories
Buildings and structures completed in 1998
Diamond mines in Canada
Diatremes of the Northwest Territories
Eocene volcanoes
Mines in the Northwest Territories
Open-pit mines
Paleocene volcanoes
Surface mines in Canada
Underground mines in Canada